The British International School of Kuala Lumpur (or BSKL) provides contemporary British international education from early years to Sixth form, to children aged 2 – 18 years in Petaling Jaya, Selangor, Malaysia.

BSKL follows the English National Curriculum, adapted to meet international and local requirements, offering an IGCSE and A Level programme.

BSKL is a fully licensed international school, approved by the Malaysian Ministry of Education, with the following additional accreditations: 
Council of British International Schools (COBIS), Federation of British International Schools in Asia (FOBISIA), University of Cambridge International Examinations, and Edexcel.

An inspection from the Independent Schools Inspectorate (ISI), graded BSKL "excellent" in all areas of provision.

As of the 2018–2019 academic year, the ownership of the school has been switched to that of the Nord Anglia Education Group.

Location and facilities
The school started classes at a temporary facility in 2009 in Bandar Utama, a suburb of Kuala Lumpur. Due to demand a permanent campus was completed in 2011. A second campus adjacent to the current one was completed in 2013, and in 2016 the school opened an additional campus for Secondary and Sixth Form students as of 2016.

See also 

 List of schools in Selangor

References

External links
 The British Schools Foundation
 Qualifications and Curriculum Authority official website.

British international schools in Malaysia
Educational institutions established in 2009
2009 establishments in Malaysia
Cambridge schools in Malaysia
International schools in Selangor
Nord Anglia Education